Sam Wilder may refer to:

Sam Wilder (American football) (born 1933), American football player
Sam Wilder, fictional character from the American TV series Charmed
 Samuel Gardner Wilder (1831–1888), shipping magnate in Hawaii